Stork Talk is a 1962 British film directed by Michael Forlong.

It was called "a softly sentimental comedy."

Cast
Tony Britton
Anne Heywood

References

External links
Stork Talk at IMDb
Stork Talk at BFI

1962 films
British comedy films
Films directed by Michael Forlong
1960s British films